X-Men 2 may refer to:

 X2 (film), a 2003 superhero film based on the fictional characters the X-Men
 X-Men 2: Clone Wars, a video game released in 1995 by Sega of America for the Mega Drive/Genesis
 X-Men II: The Fall of the Mutants, a role-playing DOS game for the PC